Alyoshinka is a village in Dmitrovsky District of Oryol Oblast, Russia.

References

Rural localities in Oryol Oblast
Dmitrovsky Uyezd (Oryol Governorate)